= Monument to F. E. Dzerzhinsky =

Monument in Taganrog, Rostov, Russia

- Памятник Ф. Э. Дзержинскому
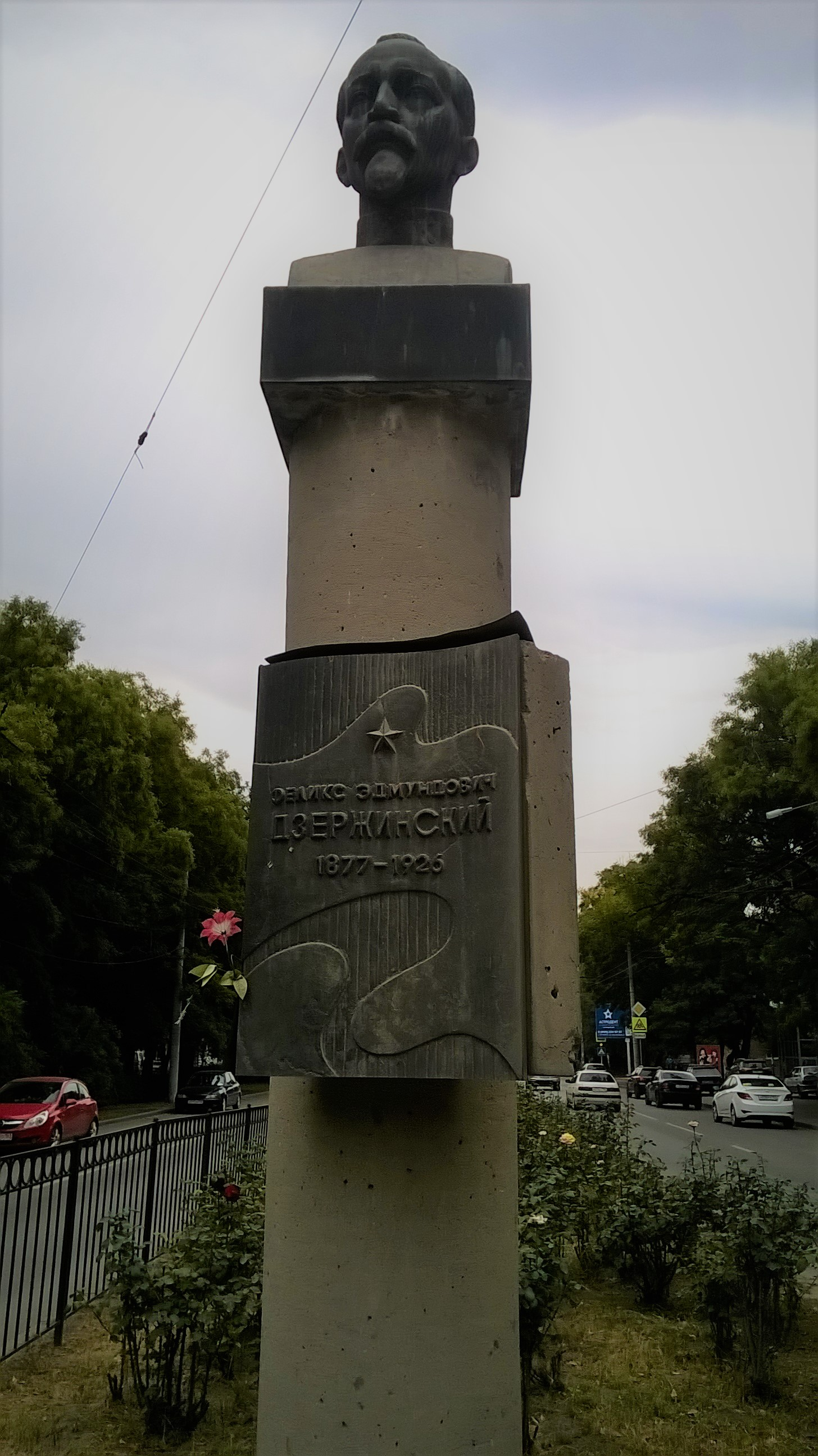
- The pedestal bears Dzerzhinsky's name in Russian (Феликс Эдмундович Дзержинский) along with his birth and death years.
- Coordinates: 47°07′54″N 39°25′21″E

The Monument to F. E. Dzerzhinsky (Russian: Памятник Ф. Э. Дзержинскому) is a monument to Felix Dzerzhinsky established in Taganrog in 1987 at the end of Dzerzhinsky Street at departure on Privokzalnaya Square.

== History ==
The sculptor is A. D. Scherbakov, the architect — P. V. Bondarenko.

In Taganrog Felix Dzerzhinsky was not though his father, Edmund Iosifovich Dzerzhinsky taught several years mathematics in the Taganrog classical men's gymnasium.

At the same time, certain relations connect Taganrog and F.E. Dzerzhinsky: he saved in 1922 Taganrog Metallurgical Works from closing. The Yugostal trust to which Taganrog Metallurgical Works submitted in 1922 decided that restoration of the plant is impossible and it is unsuitable to further work. Dismantling of the equipment was begun, and only intervention of the chairman of VSNKh of the USSR Dzerzhinsky saved the plant from elimination.

The ceremonial opening of a monument was held on November 5, 1987.
